My Generation is an American mockumentary television series that aired on the ABC network in the fall of 2010. The one-hour comedy drama, produced by ABC Studios, follows a group of high school classmates in Austin, Texas in 2000, then revisits them ten years after graduation. The series premiered on September 23, 2010, and was canceled by ABC on October 1 due to the first two episodes' poor ratings.

Premise
The series follows a group of young adults whose lives were being filmed for a documentary just before their graduation from fictional Greenbelt High School in Austin, Texas in 2000. The group includes the Overachiever, the Beauty Queen, the Nerd, the Punk, the Jock, the Brain, the Rich Kid, the Rock Star, and the Wallflower. Their hopes and dreams for the future were recorded, and as they meet up ten years later, they find that things do not always go as planned. Several of the characters' lives after high school are affected by or tied to real-world events such as the September 11 attacks, the Enron scandal, and the War in Afghanistan. The series is set in the present with flashbacks to the past.

Development and production
My Generation is based on the Swedish series God's Highway (Blomstertid). The pilot script, originally titled Generation Y, was written by Noah Hawley.  ABC gave a production order for the pilot in January 2010.

In early February, Keir O'Donnell and Michael Stahl-David became the first actors cast in the pilot. Julian Morris, Daniella Alonso, and Kelli Garner then joined the ensemble cast in late February, followed by Anne Son. Jaime King and Mehcad Brooks came on board in early March, followed quickly by Sebastian Sozzi, who booked the final principal role a few days later.

Filming began in mid-March. Craig Gillespie directed the pilot. In May 2010, ABC announced it had added the series to the 2010-11 schedule with a fall 2010 premiere planned.

Amid low ratings, ABC canceled the show on October 1 after airing only two episodes. In early November, ABC made the remaining 6 unaired episodes available online.

Cast and characters
Michael Stahl-David as Steven Foster, "The Overachiever". He was the class valedictorian and as such great things were said and predicted about him. Steven was best friends with Kenneth in high school, and after high school went on to attend Yale University. His father was a high-ranking executive at Enron who was sent to prison as a result of the Enron scandal. The scandal also resulted in his family assets being frozen, and as a result Steven was forced to drop out of Yale. He subsequently moved to Hawaii to work as a bartender He is now viewed as somewhat of a slacker compared to the thriving high school student that he was. On prom night he slept with Caroline Chung, getting her pregnant unbeknownst to him at the time.
Daniella Alonso as Brenda Serrano, "The Brain". In high school, Brenda wanted to be a scientist and was in love with Anders. After the controversial 2000 presidential election, she became a pre-law student and moved to Washington, D.C. to work as a congressional staffer. She and Anders also broke up sometime after high school, which neither Brenda nor Anders has fully gotten over.
Mehcad Brooks as Rolly Marks, "The Jock". He is now married to Dawn and enlisted in the United States Army the week after the September 11 attacks. He is on deployment in Afghanistan.
Kelli Garner as Dawn Barbuso, "The Punk". She was so called because of her juvenile delinquent attitude in high school; her lack of parents often translated into bad behavior. Dawn briefly dated Kenneth, but broke up with him after high school. She eventually married Rolly and is six months pregnant with their baby when the series starts. She is also living with Kenneth while Rolly is deployed in Afghanistan, a fact that Rolly objects to but agrees to for his wife's sake.
Jaime King as Jacqueline "Jackie" Vachs, "The Beauty Queen". Jackie planned on being an actress and was in one season of The Bachelor; however, she refuses to talk about what became of her acting career. She is married to Anders, but their relationship comes off to the filmmaker as awkward and forced.
Julian Morris as Anders Holt, "The Rich Kid". In high school, he was best friends with Rolly and was in love with Brenda. Although he married Jackie, he has clearly not gotten over Brenda, a fact that looms over their marriage.
Keir O'Donnell as Kenneth Finley, "The Nerd". Kenneth dated Dawn in high school and was best friends with Steven. Kenneth's father committed suicide after Enron's collapse "wiped him out"; Kenneth blames Steven for his father's suicide due to Steven's father's involvement in the scandal. Kenneth is living with his ex-girlfriend Dawn while her husband is in Afghanistan, and works as a fourth-grade teacher.
Sebastian Sozzi as The Falcon, "The Rock Star". He ended up producing artists and is friends with Steven Foster. He is considered a neutral figure as he is not involved with anyone else in the group.
Anne Son as Caroline Chung, "The Wallflower". Caroline was highly introverted in high school. She had a one-night stand with Steven Foster on prom night and became pregnant as a result. She waited nearly 10 years before revealing the existence of their son, Tom, to Steven. Tom's fourth-grade teacher is none other than Kenneth (who is unaware of Steven being Tom's father), and this is another source of potential problems. Through Kenneth, Caroline became good friends with Dawn and Falcon. After high school, Caroline became more confident and assertive.
Elizabeth Keener as The Filmmaker (recurring)

Episodes

References

External links

2010s American comedy-drama television series
2010s American high school television series
2010s American mockumentary television series
2010 American television series debuts
2010 American television series endings
American Broadcasting Company original programming
English-language television shows
Television series about teenagers
Television series by ABC Studios
Television series set in 2000
Television shows filmed in Texas
Television shows set in Austin, Texas
American television series based on Swedish television series
Television series created by Noah Hawley